The Dictionary Project is a charitable organization based in Charleston, South Carolina, U.S.A., and was founded by Mary French in 1995 to provide personal copies of a dictionary for third grade students in the South Carolina public school system. It has grown into a national organization.  To date, over 35 million dictionaries have been donated to children in the United States and internationally. It is funded through individual donations and by sponsors who implement the program in their local schools.

Organization goals 

The mission of The Dictionary Project is to ensure that everyone will be able to enjoy the benefits of owning a dictionary. This program assists people in becoming good writers, active readers, creative thinkers and resourceful learners by providing them with their own personal dictionary.  The dictionaries are a gift. The project believes that a dictionary is an essential tool for a quality education and that a student cannot do his or her best work without one.  The program is typically implemented in the third grade each year.

Organization history and growth 

The idea for The Dictionary Project began in 1992 when Annie Plummer of Savannah, Georgia gave 50 dictionaries to children who attended a school close to her home. In her lifetime she raised the money to buy 17,000 dictionaries for children in Savannah, Georgia. Annie Plummer died December 23, 1999. She inspired the creation of The Dictionary Project, a nonprofit organization.

The Dictionary Project was created in 1995 as a 501(c)(3) nonprofit organization based in Charleston, South Carolina. Its original goal was to provide dictionaries to third graders in the public schools in the three counties surrounding Charleston, and this was accomplished in the 1995-96 school year and every year since. In 2001 the project was expanded to cover the third graders in all of South Carolina’s public schools.

The project grew tremendously after it was featured in an article on the front page of The Wall Street Journal on March 4, 2002  This coverage brought national attention to the project and its founders, Mary and Arno French. As a result, individuals and groups from across the United States became involved with The Dictionary Project and sponsored the donation of dictionaries to children in their local schools.

The project continues to expand and now includes sponsors in all fifty United States, Puerto Rico, the US Virgin Islands, Canada, and various other countries. The program has been adopted by civic organizations and adapted to local communities through the sponsorship of Rotary Clubs, BPO Elks, Kiwanis Clubs, Granges, Pioneer Volunteer groups, Lions Clubs, the Republican Federation of Women and other service organizations, by educational groups such as PTAs, by businesses, and by individuals. Anyone can participate in this project by sponsoring a program to give dictionaries to children in their community.

References

External links 
 The Dictionary Project main website

Dictionaries
Education in South Carolina
Educational foundations in the United States
Charities based in South Carolina
Organizations based in Charleston, South Carolina
Organizations established in 1995